Sušica is a village in the municipality of Kruševac, Serbia. According to the 2002 census, the village has a population of 878 people.

History 
In the 15th century the toponym Arbanash was recorded in Sušica, which suggests a historic Albanian presence.

References

Populated places in Rasina District